Udea bourgognealis is a species of moth in the family Crambidae. It is found in France, where it has been recorded from the Alpes-Maritimes.

References

Moths described in 1996
bourgognealis
Moths of Europe